Kendall Manor is a historic mansion in Eufaula, Alabama, U.S.. It was built for planter James Turner Kendall. It was designed by architect H. George Whipple in the Italianate style. Construction began prior to the outset of the American Civil War of 1861–1865, and it was completed in 1867. It remained in the Kendall family; by the 1970s, it belonged to Dr. Kendall Eppes, Kendall's great-grandson. It has been listed on the National Register of Historic Places since January 14, 1972.

References

Houses on the National Register of Historic Places in Alabama
Italianate architecture in Alabama
Houses completed in 1860
Houses in Barbour County, Alabama